Thin Ice is a 1937 American comedy/romance film directed by Sidney Lanfield and starring Tyrone Power and figure skater Sonja Henie.

Plot
The plot follows skate instructor Lili Heiser (Henie), who works at a local luxury hotel in the Swiss Alps.  She falls in love with a man who goes skiing every morning (Power).  She thinks he's an everyday tourist, not knowing that he's a prince trying to escape the pressures of royal life.

The movie showcased Sonja Henie's skating talents.  After winning gold in the 1928, 1932 and 1936 Winter Olympics, Henie became a professional film actress in 1936.

The film also features Tyrone Power in the beginnings of his career.

Reception
The movie was nominated for an Academy Award for Best Dance Direction for the 'Prince Igor Suite'.

Filmink called it "Very light but fun."

References

External links 
 

1937 films
1937 romantic comedy films
American romantic comedy films
1930s English-language films
Films directed by Sidney Lanfield
20th Century Fox films
Figure skating films
American skiing films
American sports comedy films
American black-and-white films
Films set in Switzerland
Films set in the Alps
1930s sports comedy films
1930s American films